Alonzo L. Best (October 6, 1854 – June 24, 1923) was an American politician and farmer.

Born in Big Spring, Adams County, Wisconsin, Best moved with his family to Dunn County, Wisconsin. Best owned the Meadow Side Stock Farm near Downing, Wisconsin, in the town of Tiffany and raised cattle and hogs. He also taught school. Best served as Tiffany town clerk and Tiffany town chairman. He also served on the Dunn County Board of Supervisors and as secretary on the school board. Best served in the Wisconsin State Assembly and was a Republican.

Notes

1854 births
1923 deaths
People from Adams County, Wisconsin
People from Dunn County, Wisconsin
Educators from Wisconsin
Farmers from Wisconsin
Mayors of places in Wisconsin
County supervisors in Wisconsin
Republican Party members of the Wisconsin State Assembly